Gil Gerard (born January 23, 1943) is an American actor, whose roles include Captain William "Buck" Rogers in the 1979–81 television series Buck Rogers in the 25th Century.

Early life
Gerard was born January 23, 1943, in Little Rock, Arkansas, to a college instructor mother and a salesman father. In 1960, he attended Maryknoll Seminary in Glen Ellyn, Illinois, and played the title role in an all-male production of The Music Man. He graduated from Little Rock Catholic High School for Boys, and later attended the University of Central Arkansas but dropped out before graduation/

Career
Gerard traveled to New York City, where he studied drama by day and drove a taxicab at night. Gerard picked up a fare who showed a lively interest in the problems of unknown, unemployed actors. Before he left the cab, he told Gerard to report in a few days to the set of Love Story, which was being filmed on location in New York. When Gerard arrived on the Love Story set, he was hired as an extra. Later that day, he was singled out for a "bit" part, but he was not included in the finished film.

During the next few years, he did most of his acting in television commercials, almost 400, including a stint as spokesman for the Ford Motor Company. After small roles in the gay-themed film Some of My Best Friends Are... (1971), and the thriller Man on a Swing (1974), Gerard gained a prominent role in the daytime soap opera The Doctors for two years. Gerard formed his own production company in partnership with a writer-producer, co-authored a screenplay called Hooch (1977) and filmed it as a starring vehicle for himself. With Hooch completed, he traveled to California to co-star with Yvette Mimieux in Ransom for Alice! (1977) and to play Lee Grant's youthful lover in Universal's Airport '77 (1977). He appeared in a 1977 episode of Hawaii Five-O ("The Ninth Step") as Marty Cobb, a former cop and recovering alcoholic. A guest appearance in Little House on the Prairie impressed producer-star Michael Landon, who cast him in the leading role in the 1978 TV movie Killing Stone. 

Gerard then landed his best-known role, as Captain William "Buck" Rogers in the TV series Buck Rogers in the 25th Century which ran from 1979-81, with the feature-length pilot episode being released theatrically some months prior to the first broadcast of the series. After this, he was featured in a number of other TV shows and movies, including starring roles in the 1982 TV movie Hear No Evil as Dragon, the short-lived series Sidekicks (1986) and E.A.R.T.H. Force (1990).

In 1992, Gerard hosted the reality TV series Code 3, which followed firefighters from different areas of the US as they respond to emergency calls. The show ran on the Fox TV Network until the following year. For the remainder of the 1990s, Gerard made guest appearances on various TV shows, including Fish Police, Brotherly Love, The Big Easy, Days of Our Lives and Pacific Blue.

In January 2007, Gerard was the subject of the one-hour documentary Action Hero Makeover, which was written, produced and directed by his then-longtime companion, Adrienne Crow for the Discovery Health Channel. The film documented his year-long progress after undergoing life-saving mini-gastric bypass surgery in October 2005. According to the program, he had been struggling with his weight for 40 years, losing weight only to gain it back.

Gerard and his Buck Rogers co-star Erin Gray reunited in 2007 for the TV film Nuclear Hurricane, and also returned to the Buck Rogers universe by playing the characters' parents in the pilot episode of James Cawley's Buck Rogers Begins Internet video series in 2009.

Gerard guest-starred as Admiral Jack Sheehan in "Kitumba", the January 1, 2014, episode of the fan web series Star Trek: Phase II.

In 2015, Gerard voiced Megatronus in Transformers: Robots in Disguise.

Personal life

By the end of the 1980s, Gerard had been married and divorced four times. His first marriage, in the 1960s to a secretary in his home state of Arkansas, lasted just eight months. After moving to New York to pursue his acting ambitions, his second marriage to a bank executive was equally troubled though lasted (on and off) for seven years. Following his move to Los Angeles in the late 1970s, he married model/actress Connie Sellecca in 1979. Their son, Gilbert Vincent Gerard, or "Gib", was born in 1981. Their seven-year marriage began to disintegrate following the cancellation of Gerard's show Buck Rogers in the 25th Century and his increasing addictions to drugs, alcohol, and overeating. The marriage was formally dissolved in 1987, following a bitter custody battle which gave Sellecca main custody of their son. Gerard married again the same year, to interior designer Bobi Leonard, though the marriage lasted only a year and was then formally dissolved in 1989.

Gerard has been frank about his battle with addictions. Although he went through recovery for his addiction to cocaine and alcohol, following his divorce from Sellecca in the mid 1980s, his compulsive eating habits increased and he would find himself devouring unhealthy portions of junk food.

Filmography

Film

Television

References

General references

Inline citations

External links 

1943 births
American male film actors
American male television actors
American male voice actors
Living people
Male actors from Little Rock, Arkansas
20th-century American male actors
21st-century American male actors
University of Central Arkansas alumni
Toy collectors